Getahead is the second studio album by the British pop band, Curiosity Killed the Cat. The album reached number 29 in the UK, and contained the hit single "Name and Number".

Track listing

Charts

Weekly charts

Singles

References

1989 albums
Curiosity Killed the Cat albums
Albums produced by Nathan East
Albums produced by Allen Toussaint
Mercury Records albums